Garðar (also spelled Gardar) is an Old Norse word meaning "strongholds", "enclosures" or "settlements". It may refer to: also means Garðar in Icelandic

Places and jurisdictions 
In the meaning "strongholds":
 Garðaríki, modern territory of Belarus, western Russia and Ukraine.

In the meaning "settlements":
 Garðar, Greenland, a Norse settlement and titular see
 Gardar, North Dakota, an unincorporated community in the US, built up chiefly by Icelanders

Persons 
 Garðar Árnason (born 1938), Icelandic footballer
 Garðar Thór Cortes (born 1974), Icelandic tenor
 Gardar Eide Einarsson (born 1976), Norwegian-born artist 
 Garðar Gunnlaugsson (born 1983), Icelandic football forward
 Garðar Jóhannsson (born 1980 ), Icelandic football striker
 Garðar Svavarsson (fl. 860s), Swede who was the first Scandinavian to live on Iceland

See also 
 Homo gardarensis, a paleontological false type of man named after the above Greenland town
 Garðarsson

Icelandic masculine given names